The Nuestra Belleza Mexico 2014 pageant was held at the Jardines de México in Jojutla, Morelos, México on October 25, 2014. Thirty-two contestants of the Mexican Republic competed for the national title, which was won by Wendolly Esparza from Aguascalientes who later competed in Miss Universe 2015 in the United States where she was a semifinalist in the Top 15. Esparza was crowned by outgoing Nuestra Belleza México titleholder Josselyn Garciglia. She is the second Hidrocálida to win this title.

The Nuestra Belleza Mundo México title was won by Yamelin Ramírez from Sonora who later competed in Miss World 2015 in China. Ramírez was crowned by outgoing Nuestra Belleza Mundo México titleholder Daniela Álvarez. She is the second Sonorense to win this title, also was the last Nuestra Belleza Mundo México titleholder before the Nuestra Belleza México Organization lost the Miss World franchise.

Lorena Sevilla from Colima was designated by the Nuestra Belleza México Organization as Nuestra Belleza Internacional México 2015. She competed in Miss International 2015 in Japan where she was semifinalist in the Top 10. She is the first Colimense to win this Title.

For the third consecutive time and for the seventh time in the history of the pageant, two events were held separately to select the two winners for the titles Nuestra Belleza México and Nuestra Belleza Mundo México.

This year nobody was recognized with the "Corona al Mérito 2014".

Results

Placements

Nuestra Belleza Mundo México
Two days before to the final competition was held the semi-final competition with a live show entitled "Nuestra Belleza Mundo Mexico" in which was announced the winner of the Nuestra Belleza Mundo México title Yamelin Ramírez from Sonora who will represent the country in Miss World 2015. All contestants competed in swimsuit and evening gown during the contest.

The Nuestra Belleza Mundo México pageant was held at the Jardines de México in Jojutla, Morelos, México on October 23, 2014 and was hosted by Luz Elena González and David Zepeda. It was the 7th edition of the "Nuestra Belleza Mundo México" contest and as an official separate pageant to choose Mexico's representative to Miss World. The Winner of this event does not compete in the final night competition.

Contestants

Designates
 Estado de México – Vanessa Acero
  – Karina Martín
  – Kynué Mascareño

Returning states
Last competed in 2012:

Withdrawals

 – Estephany García resigned to compete for personal reasons.

References

External links
Official Website

.Mexico
2014 in Mexico
2014 beauty pageants